Naval Station Bremerton is a former station of the United States Navy that was merged with Naval Submarine Base Bangor into Naval Base Kitsap in 2004. Kitsap serves as host command for the Navy's fleet throughout the Pacific Northwest. It is home to the Puget Sound Naval Shipyard and Intermediate Maintenance Facility. In addition to performing drydock and overhaul services for active naval vessels, it is also home to an inactive ship facility for several decommissioned warships, including aircraft carriers. Naval Hospital Bremerton is also located aboard the installation as a tenant command.

Pacific Reserve Fleet, Bremerton
Pacific Reserve Fleet, Bremerton opened in 1946 in the Sinclair Inlet and was a United States Navy reserve fleets, also called a mothball fleet, was used to store the many surplus ships after World War II. Pacific Reserve Fleet, Bremerton was part of the reserve fleet, was used to store the now many surplus ships after World War II. Some ships in the fleet were reactivated for the Korean War and Vietnam War. The site became a Naval Inactive Ship Maintenance Facility.

Notable Reserve Fleet ships
, aircraft carrier
, supercarrier
, supercarrier
, supercarrier
Oliver Hazard Perry-class frigates
USS Dubuque (LPD-8), 
USS Rodney M. Davis frigate
USS John D. Henley (DD-553), a Fletcher-class destroyer
USS LCI(L)-652 an 
USS Berkshire County (LST-288)  
USS Nassau (CVE-16) a 
The Above Ships are all Sold, Sunk or Scrapped!
The below ships are Currently There:
Ex-USS Rodney M. Davis FFG-60
Ex-USS Freedom LCS-1
Ex-USS Independence LCS-2
Ex-USNS Rainier T-AOE-7
Ex-USNS Bridge T-AOE-10

References

Bremerton
Buildings and structures in Kitsap County, Washington
Military installations in Washington (state)
Military installations closed in 2004